Richard William Payne Davies was a Welsh Anglican priest in the 19th century, the archdeacon of Brecon from 1859 to 1875..

Davies was born in Llangenny and educated at Worcester College, Oxford. He was ordained deacon in 1830, and priest in 1832. He was the incumbent at Llangasty.

References

Archdeacons of Brecon
19th-century Welsh Anglican priests
Alumni of Worcester College, Oxford
People from Brecknockshire